Jan Stefan Rehn (born 22 September 1966) is a Swedish football manager and former professional player who played as a midfielder. As a player he represented Djurgårdens IF, Everton, IFK Göteborg, and Lausanne Sports, winning a combined six Swedish Championships with the two Swedish clubs. He won 45 caps for the Sweden national team and represented his country at UEFA Euro 1992 and the 1994 FIFA World Cup. He also represented the Sweden Olympic team at the 1988 Summer Olympics.

Club career
Rehn was born in Stockholm. After playing for a local club, he joined Djurgårdens IF from Stockholm. He made his debut in the senior team in the 1984 season. He was the Swedish football Division 2 top scorer in 1987. In 1988, he was part of Djurgården's Swedish Championship silver medal team and in 1989, he played in the 1989 Svenska Cupen Final loss against Malmö FF.

In 1989, he joined English club Everton before returning to Sweden and IFK Göteborg in 1990 with which he won five Swedish Championships. He then moved to Swiss club Lausanne Sports before rejoining his old club Djurgårdens IF in 2000, winning another Championship in 2002 before retiring.

International career
Rehn, whose parents are from Åland, received a call-up for the Sweden national under-18 football team but was ineligible to play until 1984 when he acquired Swedish citizenship. In total, he made eight U18 appearances (one goal) and 17 U21 appearances (three goals).

Rehn made his international debut in a 1988 4–1 friendly win against East Germany national football team, a match in which he also scored his first international goal in the 58th minute. He played two matches in the 1988 Summer Olympics for Sweden. He was part of the UEFA Euro 1992 squad, but did not play.

He was part of the Sweden team that finished third at the 1994 FIFA World Cup.

Management career
After his retirement, he was then part of Djurgården's coaching staff before taking the job as manager of his other previous Swedish club IFK Göteborg for the 2007 season as a joint manager with Jonas Olsson. He left in 2010. Between 2011 and 2013, he was head coach for Jitex BK, and in 2014 he joined Kopparbergs/Göteborg FC as head coach.

In May 2018, Rehn was appointed head coach of Utsiktens BK. In December 2019, Rehn announced in an interview, that he had agreed to sign a new two-year deal. However, on 29 January 2020, it was confirmed that he had left the club and that the parties never signed any extension in December 2019.

Career statistics

Club

International 

 Scores and results list Sweden's goal tally first, score column indicates score after each Rehn goal.

Honours
Djurgårdens IF

 Allsvenskan: 2002
 Svenska Cupen: 2002
 Superettan: 2000
 Division 1 Norra: 1987
 Division 2 Norra: 1985

IFK Göteborg
 Allsvenskan: 1990, 1991, 1993, 1994, 1995
 Svenska Cupen: 1991
Individual
 Kristallkulan: 1991, 1993
 Axpo Player of the Year: 1998
 Årets Järnkamin: 2001
 Swedish Manager of the Year: 2007

References

External links
 
 
 

1966 births
Living people
Footballers from Stockholm
Association football midfielders
Swedish footballers
Swedish football managers
Sweden international footballers
Sweden under-21 international footballers
Sweden youth international footballers
Swedish expatriate footballers
Djurgårdens IF Fotboll players
Everton F.C. players
IFK Göteborg players
FC Lausanne-Sport players
Allsvenskan players
Superettan players
Ettan Fotboll players
Division 2 (Swedish football) players
Swiss Super League players
IFK Göteborg managers
UEFA Euro 1992 players
1994 FIFA World Cup players
Olympic footballers of Sweden
Footballers at the 1988 Summer Olympics
Expatriate footballers in England
Expatriate footballers in Switzerland
Djurgårdens IF Fotboll non-playing staff
Jitex BK managers
BK Häcken FF managers
Sundbybergs IK players
Swedish people of Finnish descent